Bulu Chik Baraik is the state legislative assembly member from Mal. He was elected as member of state legislative assembly in 2016 as All India Trinamool Congress Candidate. In 2011, he was elected as member of state legislative assembly as Communist Party of India (Marxist) Candidate. 

He was appointed the Minister of State (Independent Charge), Government of West Bengal for the Backward Classes Welfare Department and Tribal Department under the Third Banerjee Ministry.

Early life
He was a worker Rungamatee Tea Estate  in Jalpaiguri district. His father was Firu Chik Baraik.

Career
In 2011, he won election of Mal Assembly as a Communist Party of India (Marxist) candidate. In 2016, he won the election as a Trinamool Congress Candidate. He was appointed as Minister of State (Independent charge) of Backward Class Welfare and Tribal development.

References 

West Bengal MLAs 2016–2021
Living people
Year of birth missing (living people)
West Bengal MLAs 2011–2016
West Bengal MLAs 2021–2026
Nagpuria people
People from Jalpaiguri district